In Concert is a live double album, recorded by Derek and the Dominos in October 1970 at the Fillmore East and released January 1973.

Six of the album's nine tracks were later included on the 1994 album Live at the Fillmore.  The three songs not included are "Why Does Love Got to Be So Sad," "Let It Rain," and "Tell the Truth." Live at the Fillmore also includes these songs, although they are from different sets than the ones appearing here.

Cash Box reviewed the live single release of "Why Does Love Got to Be So Sad" saying it contains "some fine guitar work and plenty of commercial appeal."

Reissue
In 2011, the 40th anniversary Super Deluxe Edition of Layla and Other Assorted Love Songs included a remastered version of In Concert. The remastered double-disc album was also expanded to include bonus tracks on each disc.

Track listing

Original Edition

Side 1
 "Why Does Love Got to Be So Sad" (Eric Clapton, Bobby Whitlock) – 9:33
 "Got to Get Better in a Little While" (Clapton) – 13:50

Side 2 
 "Let It Rain" (Bonnie Bramlett, Clapton) – 17:46
 "Presence of the Lord" (Clapton) – 6:10

Side 3
 "Tell the Truth" (Clapton, Whitlock) – 11:21
 "Bottle of Red Wine" (Bramlett, Clapton) – 5:37

Side 4 
 "Roll It Over" (Clapton, Whitlock) – 6:44
 "Blues Power" (Clapton, Leon Russell) – 10:29
 "Have You Ever Loved a Woman" (Billy Myles) – 8:15

Personnel 
Eric Clapton: lead vocals, electric guitar
Carl Radle: bass guitar
Bobby Whitlock: piano, Hammond organ, harmony vocals
Jim Gordon: drums, percussion

Certifications

References

Derek and the Dominos live albums
Live at the Fillmore East albums
Polydor Records live albums
1973 live albums